Zond may refer to

 Zond program, Soviet unmanned space program undertaken from 1964 to 1970
Zond 1, spacecraft
Zond 2, spacecraft
Zond 3, spacecraft
Zond 4, spacecraft
Zond 5, spacecraft
Zond 3MV-1 No.2, spacecraft
Zond 7, spacecraft
Zond 8, spacecraft
Zond 1964A, spacecraft
Zond 1967A, spacecraft
Zond 1967B, spacecraft
Zond Corporation, wind turbine developer